Michael Jonathon Smith (born 30 March 1966 in Edinburgh) is a former Scottish cricketer.

A right-handed batsman and right-arm medium-pace bowler, Smith made his Scotland debut in 1987 against Ireland, making 79 in the first innings, but was dropped from the side in 1990. He did not make another Scottish appearance until 1994, the year in which he made his top score of 100. Smith appeared in the ICC Trophy in 1997 and was in the 1999 Cricket World Cup squad.

Smith also played some senior-level rugby and later worked as a sales rep.

References

1966 births
Living people
Scottish cricketers
Scottish rugby union players
Scotland One Day International cricketers
Cricketers from Edinburgh
Rugby union players from Edinburgh